Chiwapa is an unincorporated community in Pontotoc County, in the U.S. state of Mississippi.

History
The community takes its name from Chiwapa Creek, which flows near the town site. A variant name is "Chiwappa". A post office called Chiwapa was established in 1883, and remained in operation until 1906.

References

Unincorporated communities in Mississippi
Unincorporated communities in Pontotoc County, Mississippi
Mississippi placenames of Native American origin